Hanspeter Hasler (born June 26, 1953) is a Swiss retired slalom canoeist who competed in the early 1970s. He finished 33rd in the K-1 event at the 1972 Summer Olympics in Munich.

References
Sports-reference.com profile

1953 births
Canoeists at the 1972 Summer Olympics
Living people
Olympic canoeists of Switzerland
Swiss male canoeists
Place of birth missing (living people)